The  was a private women's junior college in the city of Kashiba, Nara, Japan.

History 
The junior college was founded in 1987, and closed in 2013.

References

External links 
  

Educational institutions established in 1987
Japanese junior colleges
Universities and colleges in Nara Prefecture
Private universities and colleges in Japan
1987 establishments in Japan
2013 disestablishments in Japan